Yannick Tremblay may refer to:

Yannick Tremblay (ice hockey, born 1975), Canadian retired professional ice hockey player active 1996–2011
Yannick Tremblay (ice hockey, born 1977), Canadian professional ice hockey player active 2002–present